Plants of the World Online recognises about 330 accepted taxa (of species and infraspecific names) in the plant genus Lithocarpus of the beech family Fagaceae. Individual species are described in detail on www.asianfagaceae.com.

A
 Lithocarpus acuminatus  
 Lithocarpus aggregatus  
 Lithocarpus ailaoensis  
 Lithocarpus amherstianus  
 Lithocarpus amoenus  
 Lithocarpus amygdalifolius  
 Lithocarpus andersonii  
 Lithocarpus annamensis  
 Lithocarpus annamitorus  
 Lithocarpus apoensis  
 Lithocarpus apricus  
 Lithocarpus arcaulus  
 Lithocarpus areca  
 Lithocarpus aspericupulus  
 Lithocarpus atjehensis  
 Lithocarpus attenuatus  
 Lithocarpus auriculatus

B
 Lithocarpus bacgiangensis  
 Lithocarpus balansae  
 Lithocarpus bancanus  
 Lithocarpus bassacensis  
 Lithocarpus beccarianus  
 Lithocarpus bennettii  
 Lithocarpus bentramensis  
 Lithocarpus bicoloratus  
 Lithocarpus blaoensis  
 Lithocarpus blumeanus  
 Lithocarpus bolovenensis  
 Lithocarpus bonnetii  
 Lithocarpus brachystachyus  
 Lithocarpus braianensis  
 Lithocarpus brassii  
 Lithocarpus brevicaudatus  
 Lithocarpus brochidodromus  
 Lithocarpus bullatus  
 Lithocarpus burkillii

C
 Lithocarpus calolepis  
 Lithocarpus calophyllus  
 Lithocarpus cambodiensis  
 Lithocarpus campylolepis  
 Lithocarpus cantleyanus  
 Lithocarpus carolinae  
 Lithocarpus castellarnauianus  
 Lithocarpus caudatifolius  
 Lithocarpus caudatilimbus  
 Lithocarpus celebicus  
 Lithocarpus cerifer  
 Lithocarpus chevalieri  
 Lithocarpus chienchuanensis  
 Lithocarpus chifui  
 Lithocarpus chittagongus  
 Lithocarpus chiungchungensis  
 Lithocarpus chrysocomus  
 Lithocarpus cinereus  
 Lithocarpus clathratus  
 Lithocarpus cleistocarpus  
 Lithocarpus clementianus  
 Lithocarpus coalitus  
 Lithocarpus coinhensis  
 Lithocarpus concentricus  
 Lithocarpus confertus  
 Lithocarpus confinis  
 Lithocarpus confragosus  
 Lithocarpus conocarpus  
 Lithocarpus coopertus  
 Lithocarpus corneri  
 Lithocarpus corneus  
 var. hainanensis  
 var. zonatus  
 Lithocarpus cottonii  
 Lithocarpus craibianus  
 Lithocarpus crassifolius  
 Lithocarpus crassinervius  
 Lithocarpus cryptocarpus  
 Lithocarpus cucullatus  
 Lithocarpus curtisii  
 Lithocarpus cyclophorus  
 Lithocarpus cyrtocarpus

D
 Lithocarpus dalatensis  
 Lithocarpus damiaoshanicus  
 Lithocarpus daphnoideus  
 Lithocarpus dasystachyus  
 Lithocarpus dealbatus  
 subsp. leucostachyus  
 Lithocarpus debaryanus  
 Lithocarpus dinhensis  
 Lithocarpus dodonaeifolius  
 Lithocarpus dolichostachys  
 Lithocarpus ducampii

E

 Lithocarpus echinifer  
 Lithocarpus echinocarpus  
 Lithocarpus echinophorus  
 Lithocarpus echinops  
 Lithocarpus echinotholus  
 Lithocarpus echinulatus  
 Lithocarpus edulis  
 Lithocarpus eichleri  
 Lithocarpus elaeagnifolius  
 Lithocarpus elegans  
 Lithocarpus elephantum  
 Lithocarpus elizabethiae  
 Lithocarpus elmerrillii  
 Lithocarpus encleisacarpus  
 Lithocarpus eriobotryoides  
 Lithocarpus erythrocarpus  
 Lithocarpus eucalyptifolius  
 Lithocarpus ewyckii

F
 Lithocarpus falconeri  
 Lithocarpus fangii  
 Lithocarpus farinulentus  
 Lithocarpus fenestratus  
 Lithocarpus fenzelianus  
 Lithocarpus ferrugineus  
 Lithocarpus floccosus  
 Lithocarpus fohaiensis  
 Lithocarpus fordianus  
 Lithocarpus formosanus

G

 Lithocarpus gaoligongensis  
 Lithocarpus garrettianus  
 Lithocarpus gigantophyllus  
 Lithocarpus glaber  
 Lithocarpus glaucus  
 Lithocarpus glutinosus  
 Lithocarpus gougerotae  
 Lithocarpus gracilis  
 Lithocarpus guinieri  
 Lithocarpus gymnocarpus

H

 Lithocarpus haipinii  
 Lithocarpus hallieri  
 Lithocarpus hancei  
 Lithocarpus handelianus  
 Lithocarpus harlandii  
 Lithocarpus harmandii  
 Lithocarpus hatusimae  
 Lithocarpus havilandii  
 Lithocarpus hendersonianus  
 Lithocarpus henryi  
 Lithocarpus himalaicus  
 Lithocarpus honbaensis  
 Lithocarpus howii  
 Lithocarpus hypoglaucus  
 Lithocarpus hystrix

I
 Lithocarpus imperialis  
 Lithocarpus indutus  
 Lithocarpus irwinii  
 Lithocarpus iteaphyllus  
 Lithocarpus ithyphyllus

J
 Lithocarpus jacksonianus  
 Lithocarpus jacobsii  
 Lithocarpus javensis  
 Lithocarpus jenkinsii  
 Lithocarpus jordanae

K
 Lithocarpus kalkmanii  
 Lithocarpus kamengii  
 Lithocarpus kawakamii  
 Lithocarpus kemmaratensis  
 Lithocarpus keningauensis  
 Lithocarpus kingianus  
 Lithocarpus kochummenii  
 Lithocarpus konishii  
 Lithocarpus kontumensis  
 Lithocarpus korthalsii  
 Lithocarpus kostermansii  
 Lithocarpus kozlovii  
 Lithocarpus kunstleri

L
 Lithocarpus laetus  
 Lithocarpus lampadarius  
 Lithocarpus laoticus  
 Lithocarpus laouanensis  
 Lithocarpus lappaceus  
 Lithocarpus lauterbachii  
 Lithocarpus leiocarpus  
 Lithocarpus leiophyllus  
 Lithocarpus leiostachyus  
 Lithocarpus lemeeanus  
 Lithocarpus lepidocarpus  
 Lithocarpus leptogyne  
 Lithocarpus leucodermis  
 Lithocarpus levis  
 Lithocarpus licentii  
 Lithocarpus lindleyanus  
 Lithocarpus listeri  
 Lithocarpus lithocarpaeus  
 Lithocarpus litseifolius  
 Lithocarpus longanoides  
 Lithocarpus longipedicellatus  
 Lithocarpus longzhouicus  
 Lithocarpus loratifolius  
 Lithocarpus lucidus  
 Lithocarpus luteus  
 Lithocarpus luzoniensis  
 Lithocarpus lycoperdon

M
 Lithocarpus macilentus  
 Lithocarpus macphailii  
 Lithocarpus magneinii  
 Lithocarpus magnificus  
 Lithocarpus maingayi  
 Lithocarpus mairei  
 Lithocarpus mariae  
 Lithocarpus megacarpus  
 Lithocarpus megalophyllus  
 Lithocarpus megastachyus  
 Lithocarpus meijeri  
 Lithocarpus mekongensis  
 Lithocarpus melanochromus  
 Lithocarpus melataiensis  
 Lithocarpus menadoensis  
 Lithocarpus mianningensis  
 Lithocarpus microbalanus  
 Lithocarpus microlepis  
 Lithocarpus milroyi  
 Lithocarpus mindanaensis  
 Lithocarpus moluccus  
 Lithocarpus monticolus  
 Lithocarpus muluensis

N
 Lithocarpus naiadarum  
 Lithocarpus nantoensis  
 Lithocarpus nebularum  
 Lithocarpus neorobinsonii  
 Lithocarpus nhatrangensis  
 Lithocarpus nieuwenhuisii  
 Lithocarpus nitidinux  
 Lithocarpus nodosus

O
 Lithocarpus oblanceolatus  
 Lithocarpus oblancifolius  
 Lithocarpus obovalifolius  
 Lithocarpus obovatilimbus  
 Lithocarpus obscurus  
 Lithocarpus ochrocarpus  
 Lithocarpus oleifolius  
 Lithocarpus ollus  
 Lithocarpus ombrophilus  
 Lithocarpus oogyne  
Lithocarpus orbicarpus 
Lithocarpus orbicularis  
 Lithocarpus ovalis

P

 Lithocarpus pachycarpus  
 Lithocarpus pachylepis  
 Lithocarpus pachyphyllus  
 var. fruticosus  
 Lithocarpus paihengii  
 Lithocarpus pakhaensis  
 Lithocarpus pallidus  
 Lithocarpus palungensis  
 Lithocarpus paniculatus  
 Lithocarpus papillifer  
 Lithocarpus parvulus  
 Lithocarpus pattaniensis  
 Lithocarpus paviei  
 Lithocarpus perakensis  
 Lithocarpus petelotii  
 Lithocarpus phansipanensis  
 Lithocarpus philippinensis  
 Lithocarpus pierrei  
 Lithocarpus platycarpus  
 Lithocarpus platyphyllus  
 Lithocarpus polystachyus  
 Lithocarpus porcatus  
 Lithocarpus proboscideus  
 Lithocarpus propinquus  
 Lithocarpus psammophilus  
 Lithocarpus pseudokunstleri  
 Lithocarpus pseudomagneinii  
 Lithocarpus pseudomoluccus  
 Lithocarpus pseudoreinwardtii  
 Lithocarpus pseudosundaicus  
 Lithocarpus pseudovestitus  
 Lithocarpus pseudoxizangensis  
 Lithocarpus pulcher  
 Lithocarpus pulongtauensis 
 Lithocarpus pusillus  
 Lithocarpus pycnostachys

Q
 Lithocarpus qinzhouicus  
 Lithocarpus quangnamensis  
 Lithocarpus quercifolius

R
 Lithocarpus rassa  
 Lithocarpus recurvatus  
 Lithocarpus reinwardtii  
 Lithocarpus revolutus  
 Lithocarpus rhabdostachyus  
 Lithocarpus rigidus  
 Lithocarpus robinsonii  
 Lithocarpus rosthornii  
 Lithocarpus rotundatus  
 Lithocarpus rouletii  
 Lithocarpus rufescens  
 Lithocarpus rufovillosus  
 Lithocarpus rufus  
 Lithocarpus ruminatus

S
 Lithocarpus sandakanensis  
 Lithocarpus scortechinii  
 Lithocarpus scyphiger  
 Lithocarpus sericobalanos  
 Lithocarpus shinsuiensis  
 Lithocarpus shunningensis  
 Lithocarpus siamensis  
 Lithocarpus silvicolarum  
 Lithocarpus skanianus  
 Lithocarpus sogerensis  
 Lithocarpus solerianus  
 Lithocarpus songkoensis  
 Lithocarpus sootepensis  
 Lithocarpus sphaerocarpus  
 Lithocarpus stenopus  
 Lithocarpus stonei  
 Lithocarpus submonticolus  
 Lithocarpus suffruticosus  
 Lithocarpus sulitii  
 Lithocarpus sundaicus  
 Lithocarpus syncarpus

T
 Lithocarpus tabularis  
 Lithocarpus taitoensis  
 Lithocarpus talangensis  
 Lithocarpus tawaiensis  
 Lithocarpus tenuilimbus  
 Lithocarpus tenuinervis  
 Lithocarpus tephrocarpus  
 Lithocarpus thomsonii  
 Lithocarpus toumorangensis  
 Lithocarpus touranensis  
 Lithocarpus trachycarpus  
 Lithocarpus triqueter  
 Lithocarpus truncatus  
 Lithocarpus tubulosus  
 Lithocarpus turbinatus

U
 Lithocarpus uraianus  
 Lithocarpus urceolaris  
 Lithocarpus uvariifolius  
 var. ellipticus

V

 Lithocarpus variolosus  
 Lithocarpus vestitus  
 Lithocarpus vidalianus  
 Lithocarpus vidalii  
 Lithocarpus vinhensis  
 Lithocarpus vinkii

W
 Lithocarpus wallichianus  
 Lithocarpus woodii  
 Lithocarpus wrayi

X
 Lithocarpus xizangensis  
 Lithocarpus xylocarpus  
 Lithocarpus yangchunensis

Y
 Lithocarpus yersinii  
 Lithocarpus yongfuensis

References

Lithocarpus
Fagaceae
Taxonomy (biology)